Events from the year 1600 in Sweden

Events

 
 
 - Sweden is struck by the plague.

Births

 - Margareta Brahe, controversial countess and courtier   (died 1669) 
 17 August - Lennart Torstensson, Field Marshal and military engineer  (died 1651)

Deaths

References

 
Years of the 17th century in Sweden
Sweden